These are the Billboard Hot 100 number-one singles of 1982. The two longest running number-one singles of 1982 are "I Love Rock 'n' Roll" by Joan Jett and the Blackhearts and "Ebony and Ivory" by Paul McCartney and Stevie Wonder, which each stayed at the top for seven weeks.  "Physical" by Olivia Newton-John concluded a ten week run that began in 1981. At the time, 1982 had the second lowest number of number-one songs since 1956, with only 15 songs reaching the #1 spot.

That year, 10 acts received their first number-one songs: The J. Geils Band, Joan Jett and the Blackhearts, Vangelis, The Human League, Survivor, John Cougar, Men at Work, Joe Cocker, Jennifer Warnes, and Toni Basil. Only one act topped the Hot 100 more than once in 1982—Daryl Hall and John Oates, with two number ones, "I Can't Go for That (No Can Do)" and "Maneater".

Chart history

Number-one artists

See also
1982 in music
Cash Box Top 100 number-one singles of 1982
List of Billboard number-one singles
List of number-one albums of 1982 (U.S.)

References

Sources
Fred Bronson's Billboard Book of Number 1 Hits, 5th Edition
Joel Whitburn's Top Pop Singles 1955-2008, 12 Edition
Joel Whitburn Presents the Billboard Hot 100 Charts: The Eighties
Additional information obtained can be verified within Billboard's online archive services and print editions of the magazine.

1982 record charts
1982